Väinö Eskola (1 September 1894 – 17 October 1952) was a Finnish sprinter. He competed in the men's 100 metres and the 4x100 metres relay events at the 1924 Summer Olympics.

References

External links
 

1894 births
1952 deaths
Athletes (track and field) at the 1924 Summer Olympics
Finnish male sprinters
Olympic athletes of Finland
Sportspeople from Kanta-Häme